Erik Reece is an American writer, the author of two books of nonfiction - Lost Mountain: A Year in the Vanishing Wilderness: Radical Strip Mining and the Devastation of Appalachia (New York: Riverhead Books, 2006) and An American Gospel: On Family, History, and The Kingdom of God (New York: Riverhead Books, 2009), 
and numerous essays and magazine articles, published in Harper's Magazine, The Nation, and Orion magazine. He also maintains a blog The Future We Want for True/Slant.

He is writer-in-residence at the University of Kentucky in Lexington, where he teaches environmental journalism, writing, and literature.

Life
Reece was born and raised in Louisville, Kentucky. He received two degrees from the University of Kentucky, where he studied with Guy Davenport.

Work

Prose
Reece's first book-length prose was a companion essay to Guy Davenport's collection of his drawings and paintings, A Balance of Quinces. Before that, he published a collection of poems, My Muse Was Supposed to Meet Me Here.

Reece's 2006 book Lost Mountain: A Year in the Vanishing Wilderness (New York: Riverhead Books, 2006), with photos by John J. Cox and a foreword by Wendell Berry, chronicles the devastating effects of mountaintop removal mining in Appalachia from October 2003 through November 2004. The book grew out of an essay for Harper's Magazine entitled "Death of a Mountain: Radical Strip Mining and the Leveling of Appalachia," which was published in the April 2005 edition and which would win the John B. Oakes Award for Distinguished Environmental Journalism from the Columbia University Graduate School of Journalism.

In 2009, Reece published An American Gospel: On Family, History, and The Kingdom of God (New York: Riverhead Books, 2009), a book about Reece's upbringing as the son and grandson of Baptist preachers, his father's suicide, and his own subsequent struggle to find a form of Christianity with which he would feel comfortable—and the guidance he received from the writings of Thomas Jefferson, Walt Whitman and other American geniuses. This book, too, grew out of an essay for Harper's Magazine, "Jesus Without the Miracles: Thomas Jefferson's Bible and the Gospel of Thomas".

Poetry

Reece's first published book was a collection of poems, My Muse Was Supposed to Meet Me Here.

He edited the 2007 anthology Field Work: Modern Poems from Eastern Forests (Lexington, KY: The University of Press of Kentucky, 2007), an anthology of poems about the landscape and ecology of the eastern United States. It includes the work of modern American poets (among them, Robert Frost, Wendell Berry, Hayden Carruth, Charles Wright) plus that of four classical Chinese poets, who wandered and wrote about an area of southeastern China that is  similar in landscape and ecology to the eastern woodlands of the United States.

Awards

In addition to the John B. Oakes Award for Distinguished Environmental Journalism from the Columbia University Graduate School of Journalism, in 2006 Erik Reece received the Sierra Club's David R. Brower Award for Environmental Journalism.

References
The Future We Want Erik Reece's blog at True/Slant
Erik Reece's website
Lost Mountain website
Erik Reece interview Fresh Air with Terry Gross
Erik Reece interview via buzzflash
Reece, Erik. Death of a Mountain: Radical strip mining and the leveling of Appalachia via Harper's Magazine
Reece, Erik (February 9, 2006 [February 27, 2006 issue]) Who Killed the Miners? The Nation
Reece, Erik (April 3, 2009) Save Jesus, Ignore Easter Controversial "On Faith" column in The Washington Post
Reece, Erik (October 4, 2013) The End of Illth: In search of an economy that won't kill us. Harper's Magazine.

University of Kentucky faculty
American investigative journalists
American environmentalists
Living people
Environmental bloggers
Writers from Louisville, Kentucky
Year of birth missing (living people)